Seiyū Club

Seiyū Club (1900s), a defunct political party in Japan
Seiyū Club (1913), a defunct political party in Japan
Valiente Toyama, a football club formerly known as Seiyū Club